The 2012 United States House of Representatives elections in West Virginia were held on Tuesday, November 6, 2012, to elect the three U.S. representatives from West Virginia, one from each of the state's three congressional districts. Representatives are elected for two-year terms; those elected will serve in the 113th Congress from January 2013 until January 2015. The elections coincided with the elections of other federal and state offices, including a quadrennial presidential election. A Senate election was also held on that date, during which incumbent Joe Manchin won re-election. , this is the last time that a Democrat won a congressional district in West Virginia.

Overview

Redistricting
In August 2011, the West Virginia Legislature passed a redistricting plan which would make only minor changes to the state's congressional districts. Under the new map, Mason County is moved from the 2nd district to the 3rd district, while the 1st district is unchanged. Governor Earl Ray Tomblin signed the map into law on August 18.

District 1
Republican David McKinley, who has represented West Virginia's 1st congressional district since January 2011, ran for re-election.

Republican primary

Candidates

Nominee
David McKinley, incumbent U.S. Representative

Primary results

Democratic primary

Candidates

Nominee
Sue Thorn, former community organizer

Declined
Tim Manchin, state delegate and cousin of U.S. Senator Joe Manchin 
Alan Mollohan, former U.S. Representative 
Mike Oliverio, former state senator and nominee for this seat in 2010

Primary results

General election

Results

District 2
Republican Shelley Moore Capito, who has represented West Virginia's 2nd congressional district since 2001, ran for reelection.

Republican primary

Candidates

Nominee
Shelley Moore Capito, incumbent U.S. Representative

Eliminated in primary
Michael Davis, retired school teacher
Jonathan Miller, state delegate

Primary results

Democratic primary

Candidates

Nominee
Howard Swint, commercial property leasing manager and opinion writer

Eliminated in primary
Dugald Brown, IT specialist
William McCann, slot machine technician

Declined
Thornton Cooper, lawyer

Primary results

General election

Results

District 3
Democrat Nick Rahall, who had represented West Virginia's 3rd congressional district since 1993, ran for reelection.

Democratic primary

Candidates

Nominee
Nick Rahall, incumbent U.S. Representative

Primary results

Republican primary

Candidates

Nominee
Rick Snuffer, state delegate and nominee for this seat in 2004

Eliminated in primary
Lee Bias 
Bill Lester

Primary results

General election

Endorsements

Predictions

Results

References

External links
Elections Division at the West Virginia Secretary of State
United States House of Representatives elections in West Virginia, 2012 at Ballotpedia
West Virginia U.S. House from OurCampaigns.com
Campaign contributions for U.S. Congressional races in West Virginia from OpenSecrets
Outside spending at the Sunlight Foundation

West Virginia
2012
United States House